Alexei Vasilievich Gusarov (born July 8, 1964) is a Russian former ice hockey defenceman.  He played for the Quebec Nordiques, Colorado Avalanche, New York Rangers and St. Louis Blues.

Playing career
Born in Leningrad (now St. Petersburg), Gusarov was a veteran of the Soviet national team before playing in the NHL. He won the Stanley Cup with the Colorado Avalanche in 1996.  He is a member of the Triple Gold Club, having won the 1989 IIHF World Championship, the 1996 Stanley Cup, and the Olympic gold medal in 1988.

Standing 6'2" and weighing in at 183 lb (83 kg), Gusarov was selected 213th overall by Quebec Nordiques in the 1988 NHL Entry Draft. Gusarov is considered to be one of the finest Russian defensemen to play in the NHL.

Retirement
After his playing career ended Gusarov retired to Colorado where he started coaching the AAA hockey club Evolution. He returned to Russia 2011, first serving as an assistant general manager for SKA Saint Petersburg before moving to HC Sochi of the KHL as an assistant coach from 2014 to 2017.

Gusarov returned to Colorado, and accepting a role to begin scouting for the Avalanche from the 2018–19 season.

Career statistics

Regular season and playoffs

International

Awards and honors

Transactions
June 21, 1995 – Rights transferred from the Quebec Nordiques to the Colorado Avalanche after Quebec's relocation
December 28, 2000 – Traded by the Colorado Avalanche to the New York Rangers in exchange for the Ranger 5th round draft choice in the 2001 NHL Entry Draft (Frantisek Skladany)
March 5, 2001 – Traded by the New York Rangers to the St. Louis Blues in exchange for Peter Smrek

References

External links

1964 births
Living people
Colorado Avalanche players
Colorado Avalanche scouts
Halifax Citadels players
HC CSKA Moscow players
Honoured Masters of Sport of the USSR
Ice hockey players at the 1988 Winter Olympics
Ice hockey players at the 1998 Winter Olympics
Medalists at the 1988 Winter Olympics
Medalists at the 1998 Winter Olympics
New York Rangers players
Olympic gold medalists for the Soviet Union
Olympic ice hockey players of Russia
Olympic ice hockey players of the Soviet Union
Olympic medalists in ice hockey
Olympic silver medalists for Russia
Quebec Nordiques draft picks
Quebec Nordiques players
Russian ice hockey defencemen
St. Louis Blues players
SKA Saint Petersburg players
Soviet expatriate ice hockey players
Soviet expatriate sportspeople in Canada
Soviet ice hockey defencemen
Ice hockey people from Saint Petersburg
Stanley Cup champions
Triple Gold Club
Russian expatriate sportspeople in Canada
Russian expatriate ice hockey people
Expatriate ice hockey players in Canada
Russian expatriate sportspeople in the United States
Expatriate ice hockey players in the United States